Christina Alexandra Freeland  (born August 2, 1968) is a Canadian politician serving as the tenth and current deputy prime minister of Canada since 2019 and the minister of finance since 2020. A member of the Liberal Party, Freeland represents the Toronto riding of University—Rosedale in the House of Commons. She was first appointed to Cabinet following the 2015 federal election and is the first woman to hold the finance portfolio.

Born in Peace River, Alberta, Freeland completed a bachelor's degree at Harvard University, studying Russian history and literature before earning a master's degree in Slavonic studies from Oxford University. She began her career in journalism working in editorial positions at the Financial Times, The Globe and Mail and Reuters, becoming managing director of the latter. Freeland is the author of Sale of the Century, a 2000 book about Russia's journey from communist state rule to capitalism, and Plutocrats: The Rise of the New Global Super-Rich and the Fall of Everyone Else in 2012. Plutocrats was the winner of the 2013 Lionel Gelber Prize for non-fiction reporting on foreign affairs. It also won the 2013 National Business Book Award for the most outstanding Canadian business-related book.

Freeland was elected to represent Toronto Centre in the House of Commons following a 2013 by-election and sat as a regular member of Parliament (MP) until 2015, when Justin Trudeau formed his first government and she was appointed to his Cabinet. Freeland has held a number of portfolios, beginning as minister of international trade following the 2015 election, where she played an instrumental role in successfully negotiating the Canada-United States-Mexico Agreement and the Comprehensive Economic and Trade Agreement (CETA) with the European Union, earning her a promotion to minister of foreign affairs in 2017. She assumed her current role as deputy prime minister following the 2019 election where she also became minister of intergovernmental affairs until 2020, when she was appointed as finance minister. She presented her first federal budget in 2021, which introduced a national childcare program, in the midst of the COVID-19 pandemic. In 2022, she was part of the federal response to the Canadian convoy protest, which led to the first ever invocation of the Emergencies Act. She has played a critical role in the Canadian response to the Russo-Ukrainian War, including the implementation of sanctions on Russia and sending aid to Ukraine after the invasion in 2022.

Political commentators have given Freeland the informal title of "Minister of Everything," an honorific previously used for powerful 20th century Liberal cabinet minister C. D. Howe. Freeland was described in 2019 as one of the most influential Cabinet ministers of Trudeau's premiership.

Early life, education and student activism (1968–1993) 
Freeland was born in Peace River, Alberta, on August 2, 1968. Her father, Donald Freeland, was a farmer and lawyer and a member of the Liberal Party, and her Ukrainian mother, Halyna Chomiak (1946–2007), was also a lawyer, and ran for the New Democratic Party (NDP) in Edmonton Strathcona in the 1988 federal election. Her paternal grandmother was a Scottish war bride. Freeland's parents divorced when she was nine years old, though she continued to live with both of them.

Freeland was an activist from a young age, organizing a strike in fifth grade to protest her school's exclusive enrichment classes. She attended Old Scona Academic High School in Edmonton, Alberta for two years before attending the United World College of the Adriatic, in Italy, on a merit scholarship from the Alberta government for a project that sought to promote international peace and understanding.

She studied Russian history and literature at Harvard University. During 1988–89, she was an exchange student at the University of Kyiv in Ukraine, where she studied Ukrainian, although she was already fluent in the language. While there, she worked with journalist Bill Keller of The New York Times to document the Bykivnia graves, an unmarked mass grave site where the NKVD (the Soviet secret police) disposed of tens of thousands of dissidents. The official Soviet story held that the graves were the result of Nazi atrocities. She translated the stories of locals who had witnessed covered trucks and "puddles of blood in the road" that predated the Nazi invasion, adding evidence that the site was actually the result of Stalinist repression.

While there she attracted the attention of the KGB, which tagged her with the code name "Frida", and Soviet newspapers, who attacked her as a foreigner meddling in their internal affairs over her contacts with Ukrainian activists. The KGB surveilled Freeland and tapped her phone calls, and documented the young Canadian activist delivering money, video and audio recording equipment, and a personal computer to contacts in Ukraine. She used a diplomat at the Canadian embassy in Moscow to send material abroad in a secret diplomatic pouch, worked with foreign journalists on stories about life in the Soviet Union, and organised marches and rallies to attract attention and support from western countries. On her return from a trip to London in March 1989, Freeland was denied re-entry to the USSR.  By the time her activism within Ukraine came to an end, Freeland had become the subject of a high-level case study from the KGB on how much damage a single determined individual could inflict on the Soviet Union; a 2021 Globe and Mail article quoted the report by a former officer of the KGB, which had described Freeland as "a remarkable individual", "erudite, sociable, persistent, and inventive in achieving her goals".

She worked as an intern for United Press International in London in the summer of 1990. Afterwards, she completed a Master of Studies degree in Slavonic studies from the University of Oxford in 1993 having studied at St Antony's College as a Rhodes Scholar.

Journalism career (1993–2013) 
Freeland began her career in journalism as a stringer for the Financial Times, The Washington Post and The Economist while working in Ukraine. Freeland later worked for the Financial Times in London as a deputy editor, and then as an editor for its weekend edition, FT.com, and UK news. Freeland also served as Moscow bureau chief and Eastern Europe correspondent for the Financial Times.

From 1999 to 2001, Freeland served as the deputy editor of The Globe and Mail. Next she worked as the managing director and editor of consumer news at Thomson Reuters. She was also a weekly columnist for The Globe and Mail. Previously she was editor of Thomson Reuters Digital, a position she held since April 2011. Prior to that she was the global editor-at-large of Reuters news since March 1, 2010, having formerly been the United States managing editor at the Financial Times, based in New York City.

Published works 
Freeland is the author of Sale of the Century: Russia's Wild Ride from Communism to Capitalism (2000) and Plutocrats: The Rise of the New Global Super-Rich and the Fall of Everyone Else (2012).

Sale of the Century is an account of privatization in Russia. It is based on interviews between Freeland and leading Russian businessmen, conducted from 1994 to 1998 when she lived in Russia as the Moscow bureau chief for the Financial Times. The book chronicles the challenges that the "young reformers" championing capitalism such as Anatoly Chubais and Yegor Gaidar had in wresting control of Russian industry out of the hands of the communist "red barons". The compromises they made, such as the loans for shares scheme, allowed businessmen such as Mikhail Friedman, Mikhail Khodorkovsky, and Vladimir Potanin to seize control of the economy and install themselves as Russian oligarchs.

Plutocrats was a New York Times bestseller, and the winner of the 2013 Lionel Gelber Prize for non-fiction reporting on foreign affairs. It also won the 2013 National Business Book Award for the most outstanding Canadian business-related book.

Political career (2013–present) 

On July 26, 2013, Freeland left journalism to enter politics. She sought the nomination for the Liberal Party in Toronto Centre to replace Bob Rae, who was stepping down to become chief negotiator and counsel for the Matawa First Nations in Northern Ontario's Ring of Fire. She won the nomination on September 15, and would face NDP candidate Linda McQuaig in the November 25 by-election. During the campaign she received criticism for purchasing a $1.3 million home, although the price was consistent with Toronto's home prices. Freeland won 49 per cent of the vote and was elected.

During the demonstrations leading up to the 2014 Ukrainian revolution, Freeland wrote an op-ed for The Globe and Mail, in which she excoriated the government of Viktor Yanukovych. She supported seizing personal assets and banning travel as part of economic sanction programs against Yanukovych and members of his government. That March, during the annexation of Crimea by Russia, Freeland visited Ukraine on behalf of the Liberal Party. She met community leaders and members of the government in Kyiv, including Mustafa Dzhemilev, leader of the Crimean Tatars; Vitaly Klitchko, leader of the Ukrainian Democratic Alliance for Reform; and Ukrainian MP Petro Poroshenko, who was later elected president of Ukraine in May 2014.

Freeland was one of thirteen Canadians banned from travelling to Russia under retaliatory sanctions imposed by Russian president Vladimir Putin in March 2014. She replied through her official Twitter feed, "Love Russ lang/culture, loved my yrs in Moscow; but it's an honour to be on Putin's sanction list, esp in company of friends Cotler & Grod."

In the riding redistribution of 2012 and 2013, much of Freeland's base was shifted from Toronto Centre to the new riding of University—Rosedale, where she ran in the 2015 federal election. She defeated NDP challenger Jennifer Hollett with 50 percent of the vote.

Minister of International Trade (2015–2017) 
On November 4, 2015, newly elected Prime Minister Justin Trudeau chose Freeland as minister of international trade in his first Cabinet. She was involved in negotiations leading up to the Comprehensive Economic and Trade Agreement (CETA), between Canada and the European Union, former-prime minister Stephen Harper's legacy project. The trade deal was Canada's largest since NAFTA, and it was signed October 30, 2016.

Minister of Foreign Affairs (2017–2019) 

In a Cabinet shuffle on January 10, 2017, Freeland was appointed minister of foreign affairs, replacing Stéphane Dion as the head of Trudeau's foreign policy. With National Defence Minister Harjit Sajjan, Freeland announced Canada's military training mission in Ukraine would be extended until March 2019, maintaining the 200 soldiers previously mandated by the Harper government.

That August, she instructed her department and officials to "energetically" review reports of Canadian-made Terradyne military vehicles being used against civilians in Shia-populated city of Al-Awamiyah by Saudi Arabian security forces. The government briefly suspended Terradyne's export permits to Saudi Arabia before reinstating them; a Canadian investigation stated that it  "found no conclusive evidence that Canadian-made vehicles were used in human rights violations." This conclusion was challenged by human rights groups such as Project Ploughshares for not considering the risk of human rights abuses. Freeland sponsored bill C-47, which allowed Canada to join the Arms Trade Treaty in 2019.

Freeland condemned the persecution of Rohingya Muslims in Myanmar. She said the violence against the Rohingya "looks a lot like ethnic cleansing and that is not acceptable."

Freeland issued a statement via Twitter on August 2, 2018, expressing Canada's concern over the arrest of Samar Badawi, a human rights activist and sister of imprisoned Saudi blogger Raif Badawi. She advocated their release. In response to Canada's criticism, Saudi Arabia expelled Canada's ambassador, and froze trade with Canada. Freeland asked for help from allies including Germany, Sweden, the United Arab Emirates and the United Kingdom.

In September 2018, Freeland raised the issue of Xinjiang re-education camps and human rights abuses against the Uyghur Muslim minority in a meeting with Chinese Foreign Minister Wang Yi.

In January 2019, at the request of the Office of the United Nations High Commissioner for Refugees, Canada granted asylum to 18-year-old Saudi teenager Rahaf Mohammed, who was fleeing her abusive family in Kuwait; Freeland personally greeted Mohammed at Toronto Pearson International Airport.

Freeland condemned Venezuelan president Nicolás Maduro, who had "seized power through fraudulent and anti-democratic elections."

On April 18, 2019, she was ranked 37th among the world's leading leaders in Fortune Magazines annual list.

Freeland voiced support for the 2019–20 Hong Kong protests. In October 2019, Freeland condemned the unilateral Turkish invasion of the Kurdish areas in Syria.

Deputy Prime Minister (2019–present) 

After the 2019 federal election, she was appointed deputy prime minister and minister of intergovernmental affairs. As deputy prime minister, Freeland was entrusted with several key planks of Trudeau's domestic policy such as: strengthening Medicare, implementing the Canada's national climate strategy, introducing firearms regulations, developing a pan-Canadian childcare system, facilitating interprovincial free trade, and reconciliation with Indigenous peoples. As minister of intergovernmental affairs, her primary task was to address renewed tensions between the federal government and the western provinces, most notably with the rise of Alberta separatism.

She remained in charge of Canada-US relations, including the ratification of the renegotiated free-trade agreement with the United States and Mexico (CUSMA), roles that have traditionally resided with the minister of foreign affairs. The CUSMA was ratified in March 2020, at the outset of the COVID-19 pandemic in Canada. That August, Freeland was appointed Minister of Finance.

Minister of Intergovernmental affairs (2019–2020) 
Freeland took over the intergovernmental affairs portfolio following the 2019 election when she was appointed deputy prime minister. In her new capacity, she was responsible for handling regional issues such as western alienation—particularly in Alberta and Saskatchewan where the Liberals had failed to win a single seat—as well as the resurgence of the Bloc Québécois.

In March 2020, she was chosen as the chair for the Cabinet committee on the federal response to COVID-19. During the pandemic, Freeland developed a close working relationship with the premier of Ontario, Doug Ford—a Progressive Conservative—despite the Liberals having used the Ford government's track record to campaign against the federal Conservatives during previous fall's election campaign.

Minister of Finance (2020–present)
Following the resignation of Bill Morneau on August 17, 2020 as a result of the WE Charity scandal, Trudeau announced a cabinet shuffle with Freeland being appointed as minister of finance and Dominic LeBlanc, president of the Privy Council, replacing her as minister of intergovernmental affairs. It was the first appointment of a woman to the position. She presented her first federal budget to the House of Commons on April 19, 2021. It announced the creation of a national childcare program in Canada. The federal government proposed it would cover half the costs of the childcare program, with the provinces responsible for the other half.

On February 14, 2022, Trudeau invoked the Emergencies Act to end blockades and the occupation from the convoy protest in Ottawa, although the blockade at the Ambassador Bridge had been cleared by police the day before  and RCMP Commissioner, Brenda Lucki, would later testify the extraordinary powers granted by the Emergencies Act were not needed at the borders. As Minister of Finance, Freeland worked with RCMP and financial institutions to block financial services to participants. Although banks were granted immunity against civil suits from customers, Freeland insisted, during a press conference, that Charter rights remained in place. In June, she testified before a special parliamentary committee to answer questions about the decision. She described her appearance as "adversarial", and several committee members stated that she was evasive and did not offer new information. Though she did not say which cabinet member put forward the suggestion to invoke the Act, she stated, "I would like to take the personal responsibility for that decision, it was my opinion it was the correct decision".

Freeland was at the forefront of the Canadian government's response to Russia's invasion of Ukraine in late February 2022. At the start of the invasion, she stated in Ukrainian "now is the time to be strong". She was the first to call for sanctions on the Central Russian Bank, which were eventually imposed, and she spoke nearly daily with Ukrainian Prime Minister Denys Shmyhal.

Family and personal life 
Freeland is married to Graham Bowley, a British writer and reporter for The New York Times. The couple have three children.

She has lived in Toronto since the summer of 2013 when she returned from abroad to run for election. She speaks Ukrainian at home with her children. She also speaks English, Russian, Italian, and French. In 2014, John Geddes reported that Freeland and her sister co-owned an apartment overlooking Independence square in Kyiv.

Ancestry 
Freeland's paternal grandfather, Wilbur Freeland, was a farmer and lawyer who rode in the annual Calgary Stampede; his sister, Beulah, was the wife of a federal member of Parliament, Ged Baldwin. Her paternal grandmother, Helen Caulfield, was a WWII war bride from Glasgow.

Freeland's mother, Halyna Chomiak, was born at a hospital administered by the US Army; her parents were staying at the displaced persons camp at the spa resort in Bad Wörishofen in Bavaria, Germany.

Freeland's maternal grandfather, Michael Chomiak (Ukrainian: Михайло Хомяк, Mykhailo Khomiak), had been a journalist before World War II. During the war in Nazi-occupied Poland and later in Nazi-occupied Austria he was chief editor of the Ukrainian daily newspaper Krakivs'ki Visti (News of Krakow) for the Nazi regime. After Chomiak's death in 1984, John-Paul Himka, a professor of history at the University of Alberta, who was Chomiak's son-in-law (and also Freeland's uncle by marriage), used Chomiak's records, including old issues of the newspaper, as the basis of several scholarly papers focused on the coverage of Soviet mass-murders of Ukrainian civilians. These papers also examined the use of these massacres as Nazi propaganda against Jews. In 2017, when Russian-affiliated websites, e.g. Russia Insider and "New Cold War", further publicized Chomiak's connection to Nazism, Freeland and her spokespeople responded by claiming that this was a Russian disinformation campaign during her appointment to the position of minister of foreign affairs. Her office later denied Chomiak ever collaborated with the Nazi Germany. However, reporting by The Globe and Mail showed that Freeland had known of her grandfather's Nazi ties since at least 1996, when she helped edit a scholarly article by Himka for the Journal of Ukrainian Studies.

Electoral history

Bibliography

Books

See also 
 List of female finance ministers
 List of female foreign ministers

Notes

References

External links 

 
 
 Bio from Prime Minister's Site
 

1968 births
Living people
20th-century Canadian non-fiction writers
20th-century Canadian women writers
21st-century Canadian non-fiction writers
21st-century Canadian women politicians
21st-century Canadian women writers
Alumni of St Antony's College, Oxford
Canadian business writers
Canadian expatriates in the United States
Canadian Ministers of Finance
Canadian Ministers of Foreign Affairs
Canadian people of Scottish descent
Canadian people of Ukrainian descent
Canadian Rhodes Scholars
Canadian women diplomats
Canadian women economists
Canadian women journalists
Canadian women non-fiction writers
Deputy Prime Ministers of Canada
Financial Times editors
Harvard University alumni
Journalists from Alberta
Liberal Party of Canada MPs
Members of the 29th Canadian Ministry
Members of the House of Commons of Canada from Ontario
Members of the King's Privy Council for Canada
People educated at a United World College
People from Northern Sunrise County
People from Old Toronto
The Globe and Mail columnists
The Globe and Mail editors
Thomson Reuters people
Female finance ministers
Female foreign ministers
Women business writers
Women government ministers of Canada
Women in Ontario politics
Women members of the House of Commons of Canada
Writers about Russia
Writers from Alberta